Petia Dacheva (born  March 10, 1985) is a Bulgarian triple jumper.

Competition record

References

1985 births
Living people
Bulgarian female triple jumpers
Competitors at the 2009 Summer Universiade
21st-century Bulgarian women
20th-century Bulgarian women